The Homalco First Nation (Comox language: χʷɛmaɬku, also spelled Xwémalhkwu) is a First Nations government located in Bute Inlet near the upper Sunshine Coast of British Columbia, Canada. The Homalco are also known, with their neighbours the Sliammon and Klahoose and the K'ómoks of nearby parts of Vancouver Island, as the Mainland Comox. Their ancestral tongue is the Comox language.

The Homalco First Nation is a member government of the Naut'sa mawt Tribal Council.

See also
Comox language

References

External links
 Homalco First Nation website
Naut'sa mawt Tribal Council website

Coast Salish governments
South Coast of British Columbia